It's Complicated can refer to:

Television 

It's Complicated (film), a 2009 romantic comedy film
Denise Richards: It's Complicated, a reality TV show

Music 

 It's Complicated (album), a 2016 album by Da' T.R.U.T.H.
 It's Complicated (EP), a 2018 EP by Wale
"It's Complicated" (A Day to Remember song), 2011
"It's Complicated" (Maraaya song), 2017

See also 

Complicated (disambiguation)